In probability theory, the arcsine laws are a collection of results for one-dimensional random walks and Brownian motion (the Wiener process).

All three laws relate path properties of the Wiener process to the arcsine distribution. A random variable X on [0,1] is arcsine-distributed if

Statement of the laws
Throughout we suppose that (Wt)0  ≤ t ≤ 1 ∈ R is the one-dimensional Wiener process on [0,1]. Scale invariance ensures that the results can be generalised to Wiener processes run for t ∈[0,∞).

First (Lévy's) arcsine law
The first arcsine law states that the proportion of time that the one-dimensional Wiener process is positive follows an arcsine distribution. Let

 

be the measure of the set of times in [0,1] at which the Wiener process is positive. Then  is arcsine distributed.

Second arcsine law
The second arcsine law describes the distribution of the last time the Wiener process changes sign. Let

 

be the time of the last zero. Then L is arcsine distributed.

Third arcsine law
The third arcsine law states that the time at which a Wiener process achieves its maximum is arcsine distributed.

The statement of the law relies on the fact that the Wiener process has an almost surely unique maxima, and so we can define the random variable M which is the time at which the maxima is achieved. i.e. the unique M such that

 

Then M is arcsine distributed.

Equivalence of the second and third laws
Defining the running maximum process Mt of the Wiener process

 

then the law of Xt = Mt − Wt has the same law as a reflected Wiener process |Bt| (where Bt is a Wiener process independent of Wt).

Since the zeros of B and |B| coincide, the last zero of X has the same distribution as L, the last zero of the Wiener process. The last zero of X occurs exactly when W achieves its maximum. It follows that the second and third laws are equivalent.

Notes

References
 

 

Wiener process
Statistical mechanics